In linguistics, a zero or null is a segment which is not pronounced or written. It is a useful concept in analysis, indicating lack of an element where one might be expected.  It is usually written with the symbol "∅", in Unicode . A common ad hoc solution is to use the Scandinavian capital letter Ø instead.

There are several kinds of zero:

In phonetics, a null phoneme or zero phone indicates that no phone is produced where one might be expected. For example, in syllable structure analysis, null onset indicates that a syllable lacks an initial consonant (onset) that is normally required by phonotactics of the considered language. For an example, see Standard Chinese phonology#Zero onset.
In morphology, a zero morph, consisting of no phonetic form, is an allomorph of a morpheme that is otherwise realized in speech.  In the phrase two sheep-∅, the plural marker is a zero morph (see nouns with identical singular and plural forms), which is an allomorph of -s as in two cows. In the phrase I like-∅ it, the verb conjugation has a zero affix, as opposed to the third-person singular present -s in he likes it.
In grammar, a zero pronoun occurs in some languages. In the English sentence nobody knows ∅ the zero pronoun plays the role of the object of the verb, and in ∅ makes no difference it plays the role of the subject.  Likewise, the zero pronoun in the book ∅ I am reading plays the role of the relative pronoun that in the book that I am reading. In generative grammar, this is also referred to as PRO. In pronoun-dropping languages, including null subject languages such as most Romance languages, the zero pronoun is a prominent feature.
A zero subordinate conjunction occurs in English in sentences like I know ∅ he likes me, in which the zero conjunction plays the role of the subordinate conjunction that in I know that he likes me. This comes naturally to native speakers of English, but non-native learners have to consciously adjust to it, as it rarely occurs in other languages.
A zero article is an unrealized indefinite or definite article in some languages, such as the plural indefinite article in English.
A zero copula, in which a copula such as the verb to be is implied but absent. In English the copula is sometimes omitted in some nonstandard dialects.

See also
 Empty string
 Zero consonant
 Silent letter
 Zero-marking in English
 Zero-marking language

References

External links
 What is a zero?, SIL Glossary of linguistic terms

 
Linguistic morphology
Syntax